Thiruvananthapuram District, is the southernmost district in the Indian state of Kerala. The district was created in 1949, with its headquarters in the city of Thiruvananthapuram, which is also Kerala's administrative centre. The present district was created in 1956 by separating the four southernmost Taluks of the erstwhile district to form Kanyakumari district. The city of Thiruvananthapuram is also known as the Information technology capital of the State, since it is home to the first and largest IT park in India, Technopark, established in 1990. The district is home to more than 9% of total population of the state.

At the 2011 census, it had a population of 3,301,427, making it the second most populous district in Kerala after Malappuram district. The district is divided into six subdistricts: Thiruvananthapuram, Chirayinkeezhu, Neyyattinkara, Nedumangadu, Varkala, and Kattakada. The urban bodies in the district are the Thiruvananthapuram Corporation, and the Varkala, Neyyattinkara, Attingal, and Nedumangad municipalities.

The district has three major rivers, several freshwater lakes, and over 300 ponds. Its eastern region is forested, northern regions are mostly under rubber cultivation and the remaining areas grow mixed dry-land crops of coconut, plantain, and tapioca, among others. Built-up areas and rice fields complete the land use pattern.

Etymology
The name Thiruvananthapuram, shared by the district and its headquarters city, comes from the Tamil word "Thiru" and Sanskrit word "anantha-pura", meaning "Abode of Lord Anantha". The name derives from the deity of the Hindu temple at the center of Thiruvananthapuram city. Anantha is the another name of Vishnu, the deity of Sree Padmanabhaswamy temple . The district's official name in English was Trivandrum until 1991, when the government reinstated the city's original name, Thiruvananthapuram, in all languages.

History

The city of Thiruvananthapuram features several landmarks with regards to ancient tradition, folklore, and literature. Several other locations in the district feature similar landmarks. The Chera dynasty governed the area of Malabar Coast between Kanyakumari in the south to Kasaragod in the north. This included Palakkad Gap, Coimbatore, Salem, and Kolli Hills. The region around Coimbatore served as the eastern entrance to the Palakkad Gap, the principal trade route between the Malabar Coast and Tamil Nadu. The southernmost region of present-day Malabar coast (the coastal belt between Kanyakumari and Kollam) was under the Ay dynasty, who were related to, and officially feudatories of the Cheras. The Ay Dynasty (later known as the Venad Dynasty and finally the Thiruvithamkur Dynasty), followed by the Nannan Dynasty (later known as the Mushika dynasty and finally the Kolathiri dynasty), were the two oldest and most important lineages of the Velir clan, who had very frequent intermarriages with the Cheras, Cholas, and the Pandyas.

Present-day Thiruvananthapuram city, district, and Kanyakumari district, were ruled by the Ay dynasty during ancient and medieval ages, which was a Tamil kingdom based in the southernmost part of Indian Subcontinent. Ay kingdom had experienced attacks and conquests by Cholas and Pandyas in various periods. Later it became a part of Venad in late middle ages, which was eventually expanded as the powerful kingdom of Travancore in 18th century CE. The Tamil-Dravidian kind of architecture is also found in Padmanabhaswamy temple, which makes it distinct from the architectural style of temples in Kerala in general.

The location had earlier been frequented by the Dutch, then by the British. It was from here that the English gradually extended their diplomacy to other parts of Travancore.

Modern history begins with Marthanda Varma (1729 CE–1758 CE), generally regarded as the Father of modern Travancore. In the early 18th century CE, the Travancore royal family adopted some members from the royal family of Kolathunadu (a long separated younger sister dynasty of Ay/Venad/Thiruvithamkur with whom they had the tradition of mutual adoption of heirs for centuries) based in Kannur. Thiruvananthapuram was known as a great center of intellectual and artistic activity at this time. Travancore became the most dominant state in Kerala by defeating the powerful Zamorin of Kozhikode in the battle of Purakkad in 1755.

The temple of Vishnu reclining on Anantha, the Sri Padmanabhaswamy temple, is the most recognizable and iconic landmark of the city and the district and dates back to the 16th century. In addition to the presiding deity of Padmanabha, this temple contains several shrines, dedicated to Lord Krishna, Lord Narasimha, Lord Ganesha, and Lord Ayyappa. It was built by King Marthanda Varma of the Travancore royal family in 1745, when he transferred the Travancore capital from Padmanabhapuram, now in neighbouring Kanyakumari District in Tamil Nadu. King Marthanda Varma began his reign as 'Sree Padmanabhadasa', the Slave of Sree Padmanabha. The vast temple complex, with its tall Gopuram decorated with detailed carvings reflected in a huge temple tank, is today a center of attraction for devotees and sightseers.

The city was the capital of the Travancore state from 18th century CE until India's independence. The Thiruvananthapuram Municipality came into existence in 1920 as the first municipality in Travancore region. After two decades, during the reign of Sree Chithira Thirunal, Thiruvananthapuram Municipality was converted into Corporation on 30 October 1940. Consequent to the recommendations of the State Reorganization Commission, the Vilavancode subdistrict of Thiruvananthapuram was merged with Tamil Nadu, along with another three southern subdistricts, Thovala, Agastheewaram, and Kalkulam from Travancore which eventually formed Tamil Nadu's Kanyakumari district. The state of Kerala came into being on 1 November 1956.

Kilimanoor palace

In 1705 (ME 880) the son and two daughters of Ittammar Raja of Parappanad royal house (originally based at Parappanangadi in present-day Malappuram district) were adopted into the Royal house of Venad. Ittammar Raja's sister and her sons, Rama Varma and Raghava Varma, settled in Kilimanoor and married the now adopted sisters. Marthanda Varma, the founder of the Kingdom of Travancore, was the son of Raghava Varma. The nephew of Raghava Varma, Ravi Varma Koil Thampuran, married the sister of Marthanda Varma. Their son became known as Dharma Raja Kartika Thirunnal Rama Varma.

In 1740 when an allied force, led by Dutchman Captain Hockert supporting the Deshinganadu King, attacked Venad, an army from Kilimanoor resisted and then defeated them. Although a small victory, this was the first time an Indian army had defeated a European power. In 1753, in recognition of this feat, Marthanda Varma exempted the areas controlled by the Kilimanoor palace from taxes, and granted them autonomous status. The present palace complex was built at this time, together with the Ayyappa temple. for the family deity, Sastha or Ayyapan.

Velu Thampi Dalawa held meetings at Kilimanoor palace while planning uprisings against the British. He handed over his sword at the palace before going into his final battle against the British, and India's first President, Dr Rajendra Prasad received this sword from the palace and it was kept in the National Museum in Delhi. Afterwards the sword was moved to the Napier Museum, Trivandrum.

Geography

The district stretches  along the shores of the Arabian Sea on the west. Kollam district lies to the north, with the Tirunelveli and Kanyakumari districts of Tamil Nadu to the east and south respectively.

Climate
The climate of Thiruvananthapuram district is generally hot and tropical. Large forest reserves have a favorable effect on the climate and induce rains. Cold weather is experienced in the mountain ranges. Lower down, the weather is bracing, and generally hot in the coastal regions. The mean maximum temperature is 95 °F (35 °C) and the mean minimum temperature is 69 °F (20 °C). As the district stretches from north to south, with the Arabian Sea to the west, the relative humidity is generally high. It rises to about 95% during the southwest monsoon.

The southwest monsoon, from June to September is the principal rainy season, during which the district receives most of its annual rainfall. The second rainy season is the Northeast monsoon, from October to November. The district also experiences thunderstorm rains in the pre-monsoon months of April and May.

December to February are the coolest months. The average temperature drops to 69 °F (20 °C) in these months, generally considered India's winter season. The summer season starts in February and continues until May. The average temperature rises to 95 °F (35 °C) in these months.

Economy

The media and information technology sectors are mainstays of Thiruvananthapuram district's economy, and other major sectors are tourism and leisure, agriculture, and education. India's first animation park, the Kinfra Animation Park, is in the district.

Thiruvananthapuram district has 2 central-sector, 14 state-sector, 1 co-operative-sector, 4 joint-sector, and 60 private-sector medium- and large-scale enterprises. As of 31 March 2003, Kerala State Industrial Development Corporation (KSIDC) units employed 9,262 people, and had invested Rs. 3439.4 million. In 2002, there were 901 registered working factories, including oil mills, cashew factories, Cotton mills, Sawmills, printing units, rubber industrial units, chemical units, match factories, general engineering units, and automobile workshops. The Shree Mulam Thirunal Shashtiabdapoorthy Memorial Institute (S.M.S.M. Institute) in Thiruvananthapuram city is a major state government emporium marketing products of Kerala's handicraft industries.

The Neyyar river is the source of water for the Neyyar reservoir.

Administration

The headquarters of the district administration is at Kudappanakunnu, Thiruvananthapuram. The district administration is headed by the District collector. He is assisted by five deputy collectors with responsibility for general matters, land acquisition, revenue recovery, land reforms, and elections.

Municipal towns

There are 4 municipal towns in the district. They are:

Legislative representation

There are two Lok Sabha constituency in Thiruvananthapuram: Attingal and Thiruvanthapuram.

There are 14 Kerala Legislative Assembly seats in Thiruvananthapuram district.

Taluks

The district is divided into two revenue divisions which together incorporate six Taluks, each of which is headed by a Tehsildar, within them.

Taluks in the Thiruvananthapuram Revenue Division are:

Taluks in the Nedumangad Revenue Division are:

Revenue villages
Thiruvananthapuram district is divided into 124 revenue villages for the ease and decentralisation of its revenue administration. They are further incorporated into 6 taluks as eludicated below.

Neyyattinkara Taluk

 Anavoor
 Athiyannur
 Balaramapuram
 Chenkal
 Kanjiramkulam
 Karode
 Karumkulam
 Kollayil
 Kottukal
 Kulathoor
 Kulaviyode
 Kunnathukal
 Neyyattinkara
 Pallichal
 Parassala
 Parasuvaikkal
 Perumkadavila
 Perumpazhuthoor
 Poovar
 Thirupuram
 Vellarada
 Vizhinjam

Kattakada Taluk

 Amboori
 Kallikkad
 Keezharoor
 Kulathummal
 Malayinkeezhu
 Mannoorkara
 Maranalloor
 Ottasekharamangalam
 Perumkulam
 Vazhichal
 Veeranakavu
 Vilappil
 Vilavoorkkal

Thiruvananthapuram Taluk

 Andoorkonam
 Attipra
 Ayiroopara
 Cheruvakkal
 Kadakampally
 Kadinamkulam
 Kalliyoor
 Kazhakoottam
 Keezhthonnakkal
 Kowdiar
 Kudappanakunnu
 Manacaud
 Melthonnakkal
 Menamkulam
 Muttathara
 Nemom
 Pallippuram
 Pangappara
 Pattom
 Peroorkada
 Pettah
 Sasthamangalam
 Thirumala
 Thiruvallam
 Thycaud
 Uliyazhathura
 Ulloor
 Vanchiyoor
 Vattiyoorkavu
 Veiloor
 Venganoor

Nedumangad Taluk

 Anad
 Aruvikkara
 Aryanadu
 Kallara
 Karakulam
 Karippoor
 Koliyakode
 Kurupuzha
 Manikkal
 Nedumangad
 Nellanad
 Palode
 Panavoor
 Pangode
 Peringamala
 Pullampara
 Thekkada
 Thennoor
 Tholicode
 Uzhamalackal
 Vamanapuram
 Vattappara
 Vellanad
 Vembayam
 Vithura

Chirayinkeezhu Taluk

 Alamkode
 Anchuthengu
 Attingal
 Avanavanchery
 Azhoor
 Chirayinkeezhu
 Edakode
 Elamba
 Kadakkavoor
 Karavaram
 Keezhattingal
 Kilimanoor
 Kizhivillam 
 Koonthalloor
 Koduvazhannoor
 Mudakkal
 Nagaroor
 Pazhayakunnummel
 Pulimath
 Sarkara
 Vakkom
 Vellalloor

Varkala Taluk

 Ayiroor
 Chemmaruthy
 Cherunniyoor
 Edava
 Kudavoor
 Madavoor
 Manamboor
 Muthana
 Navaikulam
 Ottoor
 Pallickal
 Varkala
 Vettoor

Transport

National Highway 66 (formerly known as National Highway 47) stretches from Kaliyikkavila at its southern end to Navaikulam near Parippally in the north, covering a distance of  within the district. There are 116 bridges in Thiruvananthapuram District.
 

Rail transport in the district is operated by Southern Railway zone of Indian Railways. Thiruvananthapuram is connected to the rest of the country by broad gauge railway line.  of railway line passes through the district. Thiruvananthapuram district currently has 20 stations, including Thiruvananthapuram Central railway station.

Domestic and international airlines operate from Trivandrum International Airport, which has direct flights to many international cities, including Kuwait City, Dubai, Dammam, Singapore, Malé, Colombo, Sharjah, Muscat, Manama, Doha, Jeddah, and Abu Dhabi. Domestic flights link it with Chennai, Delhi, Mumbai, Hyderabad, Bangalore, and Kolkata.

Demographics

According to the 2011 census Thiruvananthapuram district has a population of 3,301,427. This gives it a ranking of 103rd in India out of a total of 640 districts. Its population growth rate over the decade 2001–2011 was 2.25%. Thiruvananthapuram has a sex ratio of 1088 females for every 1000 males, and a literacy rate of 92.66%. Scheduled Castes and Scheduled Tribes make up 11.30% and 0.81% of the population respectively.

Religion

Hindus (66.46%) constitute the majority of the population, followed by Christians (19.10%) and Muslims (13.72%). The Hindu community consists of Nairs, Nadars, Brahmins, Ezhavas, Viswakarma etc. The Christians belong mainly to the Latin Catholic Church, the Syro-Malankara Catholic Church,the Pentecostal churches, the Church of South India, the Malankara Orthodox Church ,the Marthoma Church and the Syro Malabar Catholic Church . The Sunni Muslim community also forms a major division of the total population.

Language

Malayalam is the predominant mother tongue. Thiruvananthapuram city is more cosmopolitan, with speakers of languages including Malayalam, English, Tamil, Telugu, Hindi, Tulu and a small percentage of Marathi.

Socio-economic conditions
More than 50% of the total population depends on agriculture for its livelihood. Agricultural workers constitute 42% of the total labour class. Most of the workforce is engaged in low-income, low capital intensity occupations. Political and social awareness and the efforts of social, religious and cultural leaders have contributed to breaking down the traditional feudal order. Economic changes have also had an impact on community social life and attitudes.

Culture

In the 20th century, Thiruvananthapuram witnessed a cultural renaissance. Kerala Varma Valiakoi Thampuran (1845–1914), who spent a major part of his life in Thiruvananthapuram, translated Kalidasa's Abhijñānaśākuntalam into Malayalam, which earned him the title of Kerala Kalidasa. He is regarded as the father of modern Malayalam prose.

A strong film culture prevails in the district. The city is home to animation companies, including Toonz India Ltd and Tata Elxsi Ltd. The Kinfra Film and Video Park, near the Technopark, is an advanced film and animation production facility.
The Malayalam film industry, formerly based in Chennai (Madras), began a gradual shift towards the end of the 1970s to establish itself in Thiruvananthapuram.

Other major cultural events include the annual flower show in Thiruvananthapuram city, the Attukal Pongala, the Varkala Sivagiri pilgrimage in December, the Kaalioottu in Sarkara Devi Temple near Chirayinkeezh, the Navarathri festival at the Poojamandapam near Sri Padmanabha Swamy Temple, the Aaraat of Padmanabha Swamy Temple, the Beemapally Uroos, and the Vettucaud Perunaal.

Flora and fauna

The district has a rich diversity of plants, ranging from rare orchids, medicinal plants, and spices to hedge plants, tuber crops, and plants yielding edible fruits and fibre. Aromatic plants and spices, such as pepper and ginger, are cultivated on a large scale on the hilly tracts. Nedumangad taluk is one of the biggest centres for the cultivation and trade of pepper and other hill produce. A major portion of the district lies on the middle plain, where coconut, rice, tapioca, tuber crops, plantains, and vegetables are cultivated.

The forests of the district abound in a variety of animals and birds, providing excellent wildlife habitats. Elephants, bison, monkeys, and rare reptiles are among the most prominent species. Nestled in the Western Ghats, a wildlife sanctuary extends over an area of nearly  around the Neyyar reservoir. The forest at the foot of the Kulathupuzha range is the habitat of rare species of snakes and lizards. Among characteristic mammals of the region are the Nilgiri langur, lion-tailed macaque, Nilgiri brown mongoose, and the Malabar civet. Carnivores include the tiger, wild cat, jackal, leopard, and dhole (Indian wild dog). The Sloth bear, gaur, a few species of deer and elephants are also seen. Reptiles include snakes, lizards, crocodiles, and tortoises. There are some 75–80 species of snakes in this area of which some are highly venomous.

Tourism

Tourism is a major sector of Thiruvananthapuram's economy. A full range of tourist options is available in the district, including hill stations, the Kerala backwaters, beaches, lagoons, and wildlife sanctuaries. Kovalam & Varkala and its internationally known beaches are in Thiruvananthapuram district.

Thiruvananthapuram is a major destination for chartered flights to India for medical tourism, with over fifty recognized Ayurveda centres in and around the city. The city also offers world-class modern hospitals. Convalescent facilities are available at nearby five-star beach resorts and hill stations.

Education

Thiruvananthapuram district is a major academic hub. The University of Kerala is in Thiruvananthapuram city. There are 20 arts and sciences colleges in the district, and the estimated total number of students is 15,926. The University of Kerala has its research and higher-education centres at Kariavattom.

Thiruvananthapuram Medical College is the premier health institute of the state and one of the finest in the country. It is being upgraded to the status of an All India Institute of Medical Sciences (AIIMS). Thiruvananthapuram's three main engineering colleges are the College of Engineering, Trivandrum, Government Engineering College, Barton Hill, and Sree Chitra Thirunal College of Engineering. The two main law colleges are the Government Law College, Thiruvananthapuram and the Kerala Law Academy Law College. Among the many other well-known arts and sciences colleges are University College Thiruvananthapuram, Mahatma Gandhi College, Mar Ivanios College, Government Arts College, Thiruvananthapuram, College of Fine Arts Trivandrum,Sree Narayana College Chempazhanthy  and Swathi Thirunal College of Music, Indian Institute of Space Science and Technology, Centre for Development Studies, L B S Institute of Technology for Women, Central Polytechnic College, Vattiyoorkavu and the College of Engineering Attingal.
 There are 1,129 schools in the district, classified as Government, Aided, or Unaided schools.
 Government schools are directly run by the state government, and follow the state government syllabus.
 Aided schools also follow the state syllabus. Additionally, there are four Kendriya Vidyalayas and Jawahar Navodaya Vidyalaya run directly by the Central government and following the Central Board of Secondary Education (CBSE) syllabus.
 Private schools run by education trusts or boards may follow any or all of the CBSE, Indian Certificate of Secondary Education (ICSE), National Institute of Open Schooling (NIOS) or Kerala state syllabi. The first international school in Kerala, the Trivandrum International School, was started in August 2003.

Media
Thiruvananthapuram has long been a media center in India. Kerala Chandrika, the first newspaper of the state, was published from Thiruvananthapuram in 1789. Now, more than 30 newspapers have been published from the district, including The Hindu, The New Indian Express, The Deccan Chronicle , The Times of India, Malayala Manorama, Mathrubhoomi, Kerala Kaumudi, Desabhimani, Deepika, Madhyamam, Chandrika, Thejas, Siraj, Janmabhoomi and Metro Vaartha.

Weeklies, fortnightlies, monthlies, bi-monthlies and quarterlies are published from parts of the district. The Kerala Information and Public Relations Department is the main government agency disseminating information to the public and for the provision of feedback.

Most Malayalam television channels are based in Thiruvananthapuram. The government-owned Doordarshan began broadcasting from the city in 1981. Asianet, the first private Malayalam channel, began its telecasts from Thiruvananthapuram in 1991.

The district has many radio stations, most broadcasting from Thiruvananthapuram city. All India Radio has an AM (1161 MHz), an FM (Ananthapuri FM; 101.9 MHz) and a SW ( various frequencies ) station in the city. FM radio channels broadcasting from Thiruvananthapuram are Gyanvani 105.6 MHz, Ananthapuri FM (AIR) 101.9 MHz, Big FM 92.7 MHz, Club FM 94.3 MHz, Radio Mirchi 98.3 MHz, Red FM 93.5 MHz, and Radio DC 90.4 MHz. Radio DC broadcasts at low-power CRS. This channel is only available within a  radius from the broadcasting station.

Wireline telephone services are provided by BSNL, Reliance, and Tata Indicom. The main GSM networks operating in the district are BSNL CellOne, Airtel, Tata Docomo, Idea Cellular, Vodafone, Reliance, and Virgin Mobile. The main CDMA providers are Reliance, MTS, and Tata Indicom. Major broadband internet services are provided by BSNL DataOne, Asianet Dataline, and Siti Cable.

Sports

The most popular sports in the district are football and cricket. Basketball, badminton and volleyball, played mostly in schools, are also popular.

The Kerala Cricket Association (KCA) is headquartered in Thiruvananthapuram city. The Chandrasekharan Nair Stadium, in city center, is a prominent football stadium and has hosted both national and international-level matches. The University Stadium has hosted two international cricket matches. This stadium is part of the University of Kerala, and has synthetic tracks for athletics. The Central Stadium has facilities for athletics, football, basketball, and volleyball, and has cricket practice nets. The Jimmy George Sports Complex is another major sports establishment in the district. The Kariavattom Outdoor Stadium is one of the largest international stadia, and can be used for both cricket & football.

References
1city.in

Further reading
 Manorama Yearbook 1995 (Malayalam Edition) .
 Manorama Yearbook 2003 (English Edition) .

External links

 Official District website
 Government of Kerala Website on Thiruvananthapuram District

 
1957 establishments in Kerala
Districts of Kerala